Thomas Alexander Boyd (June 25, 1830 – May 28, 1897) was a U.S. Representative from Illinois.

Born near Bedford in Adams County, Pennsylvania, Boyd attended the public schools.
He was graduated from Marshall College, Mercersburg, Pennsylvania, in 1848.
He studied law in Chambersburg, Pennsylvania.
He was admitted to the bar and commenced practice in Bedford, Pennsylvania.
He moved to Lewistown, Illinois, in 1856 and engaged in the practice of law until 1861.
During the Civil War enlisted in the Seventeenth Regiment, Illinois Infantry, in 1861 and obtained the commission of captain.
He served as member of the State senate in 1866 and was reelected in 1870.

Boyd was elected as a Republican to the Forty-fifth and Forty-sixth Congresses (March 4, 1877 – March 3, 1881).
He was not a candidate for renomination in 1880.
He resumed the practice of law.
He died in Lewistown, Illinois, May 28, 1897.
He was interred in Oak Hill Cemetery.

References

1830 births
1897 deaths
American people of Scottish descent
People from Adams County, Pennsylvania
Union Army officers
Republican Party members of the United States House of Representatives from Illinois
Republican Party Illinois state senators
19th-century American politicians
People from Lewistown, Illinois
Military personnel from Pennsylvania
Military personnel from Illinois